JYR may refer to:
 Jiroft Airport, in Iran (IATA airport code)
 York Municipal Airport, in Nebraska, United States (FAA Location Identifier (LID))